Ùr-sgeul was an independent publisher of new Scottish Gaelic prose.  The name Ùr-sgeul is a Gaelic word which translates variously as: a romance, a novel or a recent tale. Professor Alan Riach, in Scottish Literature: An introduction, summarises the Ùr-Sgeul publishing initiative as "devoted to prose fiction and developing an increasingly impressive list of new titles: short stories and anthologies but mainly single-author novels."

History
Ùr-sgeul was founded in 2003 as a project to promote new Gaelic fiction, and finished in 2013.  The project, taken forward by CLÀR, was conceived under the auspices of the Gaelic Books Council and with a start-up grant of £50K from the Scottish Arts Council.  In its short history, Ùr-sgeul has been prolific, and has contributed significantly to the recent resurgence of the Gaelic novel.  Ùr-sgeul is particularly notable for advancing modern genres and themes in Scottish Gaelic literature, and for the modern look and feel of the design of the novels.

Ùr-sgeul's most critically successful title to date was the epic novel, An Oidhche Mus Do Sheòl Sinn, by Aonghas Pàdraig Caimbeul.  Heavily influenced in both structure and theme by the works of Leo Tolstoy, An Oidhche Mus Do Sheòl Sinn was short-listed for the Saltire Book of the Year Award in 2004. Since then, Aonghas Pàdraig Caimbeul has produced three further novels for Ùr-sgeul, and a novella for CLÀR.

In 2008, Ùr-sgeul was featured on the half-hour Gaelic arts program on BBC2, Ealtainn.  In 2008, Ùr-sgeul also branched into avant-garde music publishing and released a CD mixing Gaelic prose and modern Gaelic music by the rock band, Na Gathan. That same year, Ùr-sgeul approached Bòrd na Gàidhlig for support to expand its activities, including provision of a full-time editor. The approach was not supported.

In 2009, Ùr-Sgeul published the first ever German-Gaelic fiction publication Der Schadel von Damien Hirst, edited by Michael Klevenhaus, launched at the FilmAlba festival in Bonn, Germany.

Finlay MacLeod was presented with the first ever annual Donald Meek Literary Award in 2010, at a ceremony at the Edinburgh International Book Festival for his Ùr-Sgeul title, Gormshuil an Righ, his first ever Gaelic novel for adults.

In 2011, the novella Cuid a' Chorra-Ghrithich by Alasdair Caimbeul was published. A Gaelic commentator provided a throw-away comment in The Scotsman newspaper: "Tha Alasdair a’ Bhocsair a’ creidsinn ann an daoine ’s ann an Leódhas ’s ann an Gàidhlig agus sin, a réir choltais, è.". "Alasdair Caimbeul believes in people, in Lewis, and in Gaelic, and this, it seems, is it."

Moral dilemmas, subversion and law breaking constituted the broad themes explored in the 2011 collection, Saorsa (Freedom).  13 new short stories from 13 writers were published, as follows:

Luathas-teichidh by Tim Armstrong
Dh'fhalbh sin, 's thàinig seo by Maureen NicLeòid
Dorsan by Annie NicLeòid Hill
An Fhianais by Màiri Anna NicDhòmhnaill
An Comann by Seonaidh Adams
Saorsa gun chrìch by Mìcheal Klevenhaus
An Drochaid by Mona Claudia Wagner
Sandra agus Ceit by Seònaid NicDhòmhnaill
Playa de la Suerte by Gillebrìde Mac 'IlleMhaoil
Iain MacAonghais by Neil McRae
Euceartas Ait by Cairistìona Stone
An Dotair Eile by Pàdraig MacAoidh
Chanadh gun do chuir i às dha by Meg Bateman

Aonghas MacNeacail wrote the introduction for Saorsa.

The Ùr-Sgeul website www.ur-sgeul.com, the German-Gaelic collaboration www.ur-sgeul.de and the digital pages www.ur-sgeul.com/digital/  - featuring audio, video and written materials for learners and native speakers - were axed in July 2011 following a decision by the Gaelic Books Council.

In 2014, The Irish Times explored the contribution of Ùr-Sgeul to the revitalization of Gaelic fiction.

In 2020, editor and journalist Alasdair H. Campbell described the marketing methods employed by Ùr-sgeul as "innovative and creative, successfully raising the profile of Scottish Gaelic fiction amongst the wider Scottish population."

Books
Saorsa short story collection edited by Joan NicDhòmhnaill and John Storey, 2011
Air a Thoir by Martainn Mac an t-Saoir, 2011
Cuid a' Chorra-Ghrithich by Alasdair Caimbeul (Alasdair a' Bhocsair), 2011
Suthainn Sìor by Norma NicLeòid, 2011
An Druim Bho Thuath by Tormod Caimbeul, 2011
Impireachd by Iain F. MacLeoid, 2010
Teas by Maoilios Caimbeul, 2010
Gormshuil an Rìgh by Fionnlagh MacLeòid, 2010
A' Ghlainne agus Sgeulachdan Eile by Mairi E. NicLeòid, 2010
Der Schadel von Damien Hirst edited by Michael Klevenhaus and Joan NicDhòmhnaill,  2009
Cainnt na Caileige Caillte by Alison Lang, 2009
Tilleadh Dhachaigh by Aonghas Pàdraig Caimbeul, 2009
Samhraidhean Dìomhair by Catrìona Lexy Chaimbeul, 2009
An Claigeann aig Damien Hirst Vol 3 (paper) - Stories 15-21, 2008
An Claigeann aig Damien Hirst Vol 2 (paper) - Stories 8-14, 2008
An Claigeann aig Damien Hirst Vol 1 (paper) - Stories 1-7, 2008
Taingeil Toilichte by Norma NicLeòid, 2008
Am Bounty by Iain F. MacLeòid, 2008
An Latha as Fhaide by Màrtainn Mac an t-Saoir, 2008
Dìomhanas by Fionnlagh MacLeòid, 2008
Cleas Sgathain by Mairi Anna NicDhomhnaill, 2008
Slaightearan by Tormod MacGill-Eain, 2008
An Taigh-Samhraidh by Aonghas Pàdraig Caimbeul, 2007
Malairt Sgeil by Donnchadh MacGillIosa agus Màrtainn Mac an t-Saoir, 2007
Shrapnel by Tormod Caimbeul – Tormod a’ Bhocsair, 2006
Ùpraid by Éilís Ní Dhuibhne (translation from Irish), 2006
Dìleas Donn by Norma NicLeòid, 2006
Gymnippers Diciadain by Màrtainn Mac an t-Saoir, 2005
Na Klondykers by Iain F. MacLeòid, 2005
Am Miseanaraidh by Iain Mac a’ Ghobhainn, 2005
Dacha Mo Ghaoil by Tormod MacGill-Eain, 2005
Là a’ Dèanamh Sgèil Do Là by Aonghas Pàdraig Caimbeul, 2004
Tocasaid ‘Ain Tuirc by Donnchadh MacGIlliosa, 2004
An Oidhche Mus Do Sheòl Sinn by Aonghas Pàdraig Caimbeul, 2003
Ath-Aithne by Màrtainn Mac an t-Saoir, 2003

Talking Books
Shrapnel by Tormod Caimbeul – 4 CD set, 2007
Gymnippers Diciadain by Màrtainn Mac an t-Saoir – DVD, 2007
Na Klondykers by Iain F. MacLeòid – DVD, 2007
Là a’ Dèanamh Sgèil Do Là by Aonghas Pàdraig Caimbeul – DVD, 2007
Am Miseanaraidh by Iain Mac a’ Ghobhainn – 2-CD set, 2005
Dacha Mo Ghaoil by Tormod MacGill-Eain – 3-CD set, 2005
Tocasaid ‘Ain Tuirc by Donnchadh MacGIlliosa. – 3-CD set, 2005
Ath-Aithne by Màrtainn Mac an t-Saoir – 6-CD set, 2004

Other publications
Claigeann Damien Hirst by Na Gathan - CD, 2008
Ruigidh Sinn Mars by Na Gathan - CD, 2008

External links
 Ùr-sgeul Gaelic fiction series retrospective
  CLÀR - publishers of Ùr-Sgeul

Notes

Scottish Gaelic literature
Book publishing companies of Scotland
2003 establishments in Scotland
Publishing companies established in 2003
Scottish Gaelic novelists